Six Girls and a Room for the Night (German: Sechs Mädchen suchen Nachtquartier) is a 1928 German silent film directed by Hans Behrendt and starring Georg Alexander, Ilse Baumann and Jenny Jugo.

The film's sets were designed by the art director Oscar Friedrich Werndorff.

Cast
In alphabetical order
Georg Alexander 
Ilse Baumann
Julius E. Herrmann
Hilde Hildebrand 
Paul Hörbiger
Jenny Jugo
Carla Meissner
Ilse Mindt
Ellen Müller
Edgar Pauly
Ellen Plessow
Adele Sandrock
Truus Van Aalten
Ernö Verebes
Else Wasa
Aribert Wäscher

References

External links

Films of the Weimar Republic
German silent feature films
Films directed by Hans Behrendt
Films with screenplays by Franz Schulz
German black-and-white films